Anna Rosling Rönnlund (born April 4, 1975) is a Swedish designer who, with her husband Ola Rosling, developed Trendalyzer, interactive software for visualizing statistical  information. After Trendalyzer was sold to Google in 2007, the couple continued work on its development until August 2010.

In 2005, together with statistician and father-in-law Hans Rosling, she co-founded the Gapminder Foundation, where she serves as vice president for design and usability. In 2016, she announced Dollar Street, a website that imagines a street of homes to help visualize how people of varying cultures and incomes live around the world.

In 2017, she spoke at the TED conference where she explained the power of Data visualization.

In 2017, she collaborated with Hans Rosling for his book titled Factfulness alongside Ola Rosling.

She sees many benefits of working on different projects with family. In an interview with W Insight portal, she talks about flexibility, convenience and being more open working with her husband. She also admits her children "came up on stage a few times."

On the fifth of November 2018, Anna and Ola Rosling were promoted to honorary doctorates at the University of Skövde in connection with the school's academic celebrations.

Publication

References

External links 
 

1975 births
Living people
Swedish statisticians
Swedish women scientists